Bödeker, Böddecker, Bödecker, Boedecker, Boeddecker or Boedecker is a German surname. Notable people with the surname include:

Bill Boedeker (1924–2014), American football player
Friedrich Bödeker (1867–1937), German botanist
N. M. Bodecker (d. 1988), American illustrator
Philipp Friedrich Böddecker (1607–1683), German court organist and composer
Ralf Bödeker (born 1958), German footballer
Stephan Bodecker (1384–1459), 37th Bishop of Brandenburg and a Christian Hebraist
Sybille Bödecker (born 1948), German slalom canoeist

German-language surnames